Alatoi Ishmael Kalsakau is a Vanuatuan politician who has served as Prime Minister of the Republic of Vanuatu since 4 November 2022. He is the head of the Union of Moderate Parties in Vanuatu.

Career

In 2005, Kalsakau was appointed the Legal Counsel of MCA Vanuatu, the Vanuatuan component of the Millennium Challenge Corporation.

Kalsakau was Attorney General of Vanuatu, but resigned the post to contest parliamentary elections. After he lost, he returned to his post of Attorney General, raising concerns from Transparency International. Following the 2012 general election, Kalsakau alleged that three ministers, including Moana Carcasses Kalosil, engaged in vote buying to secure several seats in Port Vila.

In 2014, Kalsakau was re-appointed Attorney General of the Government of Vanuatu.

Kalsakau was confirmed as Leader of the Opposition in February 2016.

Political positions

Kalsakau criticized a government proposal to introduce income tax to Vanuatu, leading a government spokesman to call on him to resign for "misleading statements".

Kalsakau has expressed skepticism regarding increased Chinese involvement in Vanuatu, as well as a lack of transparency regarding loans from China.

Family

Two of Kalsakau's brothers — Ephraim Kasakau and Joshua Kalasakau  — were also elected as Members of Parliament in 2016. His father was First Chief Minister George Kalsakau, who was involved in negotiating Vanuatu's independence from France and the United Kingdom.

References

Living people
Members of the Parliament of Vanuatu
Prime Ministers of Vanuatu
Place of birth missing (living people)
Union of Moderate Parties politicians
Vanuatuan lawyers
Year of birth missing (living people)